No Time for Tears is a 1957 British drama film directed by Cyril Frankel in CinemaScope and Eastman Color and starring Anna Neagle, George Baker, Sylvia Syms and Anthony Quayle. The staff at a children's hospital struggle with their workload.

Plot
The interwoven dramas of staff and patients in Mayfield Children's Hospital, where the doctors and nurses are in the business of restoring children's lives. One small child risks losing his sight, while twin boys fool the doctors over which one has appendicitis. Meanwhile, behind the scenes, new nurse Margaret Collier (Sylvia Syms) suffers pangs of unrequited love for houseman Dr. Nigel Barnes (George Baker).

Cast
 Anna Neagle as Matron Eleanor Hammond
 George Baker as Doctor Nigel Barnes
 Sylvia Syms as Nurse Margaret Collier
 Anthony Quayle as Doctor Graham Seagrave
 Flora Robson as Sister Birch
 Alan White as Doctor Hugh Storey
 Daphne Anderson as Doctor Marian Cornish
 Sophie Stewart as Sister Willis
 Patricia Marmont as Sister Davies
 Rosalie Crutchley as Theatre Sister
 Victor Brooks as Mr. Harris
 Angela Baddeley as Mrs. Harris
 Jessica Cairns as Lawrie
 Carla Challoner as Jenny
 Cyril Chamberlain as Hall Porter
 Christopher Frost as Peter
 Joan Hickson as Sister Duckworth
 Michael Hordern as the Surgeon
 Viola Keats as Mrs. McKenna
 Linda Leo as Sick Child
 Jonathan Ley as Timmy Gardener
 Lucille Mapp as Maya
 Richard O'Sullivan as William Reynolds
 Gillian Owen as Night Nurse
 Loretta Parry as Jackie
 Adrienne Posta as Cathy Harris
 Christopher Witty as George Harris 
 Marjorie Rhodes as Ethel
 George Rose as Dobbie
 Joan Sims as Sister O'Malley
 Hermione Harvey as Hospital Receptionist

Production
Herbert Wilcox tried to get the rights to the story but they were obtained by Associated British. That company offered a lead role to Wilcox's wife Anna Neagle. It was the first film she appeared in that was not directed by wilcox for twenty years.

Box office
According to Kinematograph Weekly the film was "in the money" at the British box office in 1957.

Critical reception
The Observer called it "sentimental but not often silly... it's overall tone is kind, the atmosphere cheerful." The Evening Sentinel said "there's just about every clinical cliche on the chart." Variety called it "a routine comedy-weepie".

Sky Movies gave the film two out of five stars, and wrote, "this is standard medical soap fare and could be mistaken for a bumper edition of Casualty": while TV Guide rated the film three out of four stars, and wrote, "Though the situations are clearly out of the movie medical bag, the ensemble manages to rise above clichés and stereotypes. Neagle carries the film as the head nurse, with good support from Syms as the new nurse on her staff".

Filmink said it "needed less subplots and more soap, but it’s not bad and Syms’ character sings and dances in this random dance number at the end."

References

External links

No Time for Tears at BFI

1957 films
1957 drama films
Films shot at Associated British Studios
Films directed by Cyril Frankel
Films set in hospitals
British drama films
1950s English-language films
1950s British films